The 1999 Regal Scottish Open was a professional ranking snooker tournament, that was held in February 1999 at the AECC, Aberdeen, Scotland.
 
Stephen Hendry won the tournament by defeating Graeme Dott nine frames to one in the final. The defending champion, Ronnie O'Sullivan, was defeated in the last 32 by Paul Hunter.


Main draw

Final

References

Scottish Open (snooker)
1999 in snooker
1999 in Scottish sport
Sports competitions in Aberdeen